Bill Luxton (1927 – 13 July 2019) was a Canadian actor who appeared in television and on stage. He was best known for the role of Uncle Willy on the "Willy and Floyd" comedy team and as voice actor for cartoons.

Life and career
Born in Toronto, Canada in May 1927 of English parents, Luxton and his family returned to London, where they endured The Blitz during the early 1940s. He joined the British Army at 18 and spent time in the signal corps, beginning in 1945.

His experiences as a teenage actor led him to the forces broadcasting system, where he trained as an operator and announcer. He spent six months in Germany and two years in Libya, re-settling in Canada after his discharge in 1948.

Post-war, the only job he could find was as a junior announcer in Port Arthur, now part of Thunder Bay, in 1948. By chance, he met Toots there and the couple remained married for 69 years.

Luxton graduated from the Lorne Greene Academy of Radio Arts in Toronto in 1950, and was hired in 1950 by CKWS-AM in Kingston, Ontario as an announcer. When CKWS-TV went on the air in 1954, Luxton was the station's first programme director and news anchor. He created the character Uncle Willy for a children’s cartoon show at CKWS.

In 1961, moved to Ottawa as one of the first employees at CJOH when that station was launched. Luxton worked at the station as an announcer on shows such as The Amazing World of Kreskin, when it was produced at CJOH, and as co-host of the long-running Morning Magazine in the 1970s and 1980s. Luxton teamed up with Les Lye in 1966 to create the Uncle Willy & Floyd show, with Lye playing Floyd. The daily children's comedy ran for twenty-two years and was syndicated across Canada.

References

External links

1927 births
2019 deaths
20th-century Canadian male actors
Canadian male television actors
Canadian male stage actors
Canadian people of English descent
Comedians from London
Comedians from Toronto
Royal Corps of Signals soldiers
Canadian emigrants to the United Kingdom
Male actors from Toronto
Male actors from London
Canadian children's television personalities
Canadian radio personalities
Canadian sketch comedians
20th-century British Army personnel